Kumaran Nagar, is a developed residential area in North Chennai, a metropolitan city in Tamil Nadu, India

Location

Kumaran Nagar is located near Kolathur, Peravallur and Perambur.

Surroundings

Neighbourhoods in Chennai